Axel Schmidt (born 19 August 1940) is a German cor anglais player and oboist.

Life 
Born in Zwickau, Schmidt learned to play the oboe from Alfred Gleißberg, the solo oboist of the Gewandhausorchester Leipzig and Peter Fischer at the Leipzig Gewandhaus Orchestra.

In 1964, he became solo English horn player with the MDR Leipzig Radio Symphony Orchestra under the conduct of Herbert Kegel. He was interpreter of early music in the Pro Arte Antiqua Lipsienis, the Telemann-Ensemble and the Capella Fidicinia under the direction of the musicologist Hans Grüß. In 1970, he became a member of the Gruppe Neue Musik Hanns Eisler and the Leipziger Consort, who devoted themselves to Neue Musik. In 1992, he founded the Trio PianOvo.

He teaches English horn and since 1976 oboe; in 1993 he became professor at the Hochschule für Musik Franz Liszt, Weimar. There he acted as dean and Prorector. His students include Michael Goldammer, Walter Klingner, Sebastian Röthig and Gunter Sieberth. He is also a guest lecturer in the Netherlands, Poland, Czech Republic, Finland and Great Britain.

Discography 
 1986: Luca Lombardi: Einklang für Oboe und sieben Instrumente (VEB Deutsche Schallplatten)
 1996: Neue Musik für Oboe (Edel Classics)
 2002: Musik in Deutschland 1950–2000 (Red Seal)

Literature 
 Burkhard Glaetzner, Reiner Kontressowitz (ed.): Gruppe Neue Musik „Hanns Eisler“ 1970–1990. Spiel-Horizonte. Leipzig 1990, .
 Annelie Schneider: Vereint Tradition und Moderne. Axel Schmidt, Oboe. Resonanz. I/2002,.

References

External links 
 
 

Cor anglais players
German classical oboists
1940 births
Living people
People from Zwickau